Nellie E. Brown Mitchell (1845 – January 5, 1924) was an American concert singer and music educator, "one of Boston's favorite cantatrices."

Early life
Nellie E. Brown was born in Dover, New Hampshire, the daughter of Charles J. Brown and Martha A. Runnels Brown. She trained as a singer at the New England Conservatory of Music, earning a diploma in 1879. Her sister Edna Brown Bagnall was also a singer, and sometimes joined her in concerts. Their brother Edward Everett Brown was a lawyer and anti-lynching activist based in Boston.

Career

Nellie Brown Mitchell was a popular singer in churches in New England, and was at one point the lead soprano at four white churches in Boston. She gave concerts throughout and beyond the New England region. In 1874 she gave a concert at Steinway Hall in New York City.

In the 1880s, Mitchell toured with the Bergen Concert Company. She also formed her own company, the Nellie Brown Mitchell Concert Company. From 1879 to 1886, she was musical director at Bloomfield Street Church in Boston. She sang at the first meeting of the National Negro Business League, in Boston in 1900.  She sang at the funeral of abolitionist William Lloyd Garrison in 1879, and was a soloist at the observance of his centennial in 1905.

Mitchell was head of the vocal department at Hedding Academy in New Hampshire. In 1876, she conducted a group of 50 girls in a cantata, Laila, the Fairy Queen, as part of the Centennial Musical Festival in Boston. After she retired from touring, she taught voice techniques to African-American women students in Boston. In 1909, she organized and hosted the first meeting of the Chaminade Musical Club, for "the leading women musicians" of Boston, named for French composer Cécile Chaminade.

Mitchell also invented the "phoneterion", a device meant to help train proper tongue position for vocal students.

Personal life
Nellie E. Brown married Charles Lewis Mitchell. He was a disabled veteran of the American Civil War, having lost a foot as a member of the 55th Massachusetts Infantry Regiment. He was also one of the first two African-American members of the Massachusetts legislature, along with Edward G. Walker. Nellie Brown Mitchell was widowed in 1912, and she died in Roxbury on January 5, 1924, aged 78 years.

References

External links
 Nellie Brown Mitchell's New Hampshire gravesite on Find a Grave.
 Janice A. Brown, "African-American Soprano and 'Queen of Song': Dover, New Hampshire's Nellie (Brown) Mitchell (1845-1924)" Cow Hampshire (September 5, 2016). A blog post about Nellie Brown Mitchell.

1845 births
1924 deaths
People from Dover, New Hampshire
American women singers
19th-century American inventors
New England Conservatory alumni
Singers from New Hampshire
Burials in New Hampshire